Khaleed  Abdul Aziz (born 7 August 1988) is a Kenyan comedian,actor,scriptwritter,mcee and a pastoralist. He is popularly known as Farah in Classmates, a TV Comedy Series currently aired by KBC Channel 1. He made his first TV appearance on  Churchill Show and later won Kalasha International Award for Best Performance in a TV Show.

Biography 
Khaleed Abdul was born on 7 August 1988, in Maralal, Samburu County, Northern Kenya. He attended Maralal Primary School where his father was a teacher, before he joined Maralal High School in 2003 where he performed comedy in Inter-Schools Entertainment, alongside his brother Ahmad Aziz.

He made his first TV appearance in 2015 in Churchill Show which saw him gain fame and made appearance in LOL a TV comedy show which was aired by K24, Hapa Kule News aired by KTN. He currently plays a role as Farah in Classmates Tv Comedy Show aired by KBC, and as Jinta H unte in Vitimbi Plus aired by Maisha Magic Swahili.

TV shows

Awards and nominations

Charity work 
Khaleed has been involved in community charity work, for instance blood donation campaign. He was instrumental in 2016 fundraising medical fee for a youth in Samburu, a Samburu boy suffered from severe kidney failure and needed kidney transplant.

Comedian Khaleed Abdul and friends rescue student who was  selling mandazi to raise school fees The story of a young boy melted the hearts of many after it was aired on various media outlets in the country. He garnered 367 marks in the 2021 Kenya Certificate of Primary Education (KCPE) but was unable to raise school fees to join Form One.
and resorted to selling mandazis in the streets of Maralal to raise school fees.

See also 
 Churchill Show

References

External links 

1988 births
Living people
Kenyan male comedians